The 1934 All-Big Six Conference football team consists of American football players chosen by various organizations for All-Big Six Conference teams for the 1934 college football season.  The selectors for the 1934 season included the Associated Press (AP).

All-Big Six selections

Backs
 Henry Bauer, Nebraska (AP-1 [QB])
 Lloyd Cardwell, Nebraska (AP-1 [HB])
 Oren Stoner, Kansas State (AP-1 [HB])
 Ben Poynor, Oklahoma (AP-1 [FB])

Ends
 Bernie Scherer, Nebraska (AP-1)
 Fred Poole, Iowa State (AP-1)

Tackles
 Milo Clawson, Kansas (AP-1)
 George Maddox, Kansas State (AP-1)

Guards
 Red Stacy, Oklahoma (AP-1)
 Dick Sklar, Kansas (AP-1)

Centers
 Franklin Meier, Nebraska (AP-1)

Key
AP = Associated Press

See also
1934 College Football All-America Team

References

All-Big Six Conference football team
All-Big Eight Conference football teams